Joseph Jefferson Jackson (July 16, 1887 – December 5, 1951), nicknamed "Shoeless Joe", was an American outfielder who played Major League Baseball (MLB) in the early 1900s. Although his .356 career batting average is the fourth highest in the history of Major League Baseball (MLB), he is often remembered for his association with the Black Sox Scandal, in which members of the 1919 Chicago White Sox participated in a conspiracy to fix the World Series. As a result, Commissioner Kenesaw Mountain Landis banned Jackson from baseball after the 1920 season. During the World Series in question, Jackson had led both teams in several statistical categories and set a World Series record with 12 base hits. Jackson's role in the scandal, his banishment from the game, and his exclusion from the Baseball Hall of Fame have been fiercely debated.

Jackson played for three MLB teams during his 12-year career, playing primarily in left field. He spent 1908–1909 as a member of the Philadelphia Athletics and 1910 with the minor league New Orleans Pelicans before joining the Cleveland Naps at the end of the 1910 season. He was still considered a rookie in 1911, when he hit for a .408 average, a single-season record for a rookie that still stands. He remained in Cleveland until early in the 1915 season; he then played for the White Sox through 1920. Later, Jackson played baseball under assumed names throughout the south.

Jackson holds the Cleveland and Chicago White Sox franchise records for triples in a season and career batting average. In 1999, he ranked number 35 on The Sporting News list of the 100 Greatest Baseball Players, and was a finalist for the Major League Baseball All-Century Team. The fans voted him as the 12th-best outfielder of all time. He also ranks 33rd on the all-time list for non-pitchers according to the win shares formula developed by sabrermetrician Bill James. Baseball legend Babe Ruth said that he modeled his hitting method after Jackson's.

Early life

Jackson was born in Pickens County, South Carolina, the oldest son of George Jackson, a sharecropper.  While Jackson was still a baby, his father moved the family to Pelzer, South Carolina. A few years later, the family moved to a company town called Brandon Mill on the outskirts of Greenville, South Carolina. An attack of measles almost killed him when he was 10. He was in bed for two months, paralyzed, while he was nursed back to health by his mother.

Starting at the age of 6 or 7, Jackson worked in one of the town's textile mills as a "linthead", a derogatory name for a mill hand. Family finances required Joe to take 12-hour shifts in the mill, and since education at the time was a luxury the Jackson family couldn't afford, Jackson was uneducated. His lack of education ultimately became an issue throughout Jackson's life. It even affected the value of his memorabilia in the collectibles market; because Jackson was illiterate, he often had his wife sign his signature. Consequently, anything actually autographed by Jackson himself brings a premium when sold, including one autograph which was sold for $23,500 in 1990. In restaurants, rather than ask someone to read the menu to him, he would wait until his teammates ordered and then order one of the items that he heard.

In 1900, when he was 13 years old, his mother was approached by one of the owners of the Brandon Mill and he started to play for the mill's baseball team. He was the youngest player on the team. He was paid $2.50 to play on Saturdays. He was originally a pitcher, but one day he accidentally broke another player's arm with a fastball. No one wanted to bat against him so the manager of the team placed him in the outfield. His hitting ability made him a celebrity around town. Around that time he was given a baseball bat that he named Black Betsy. He was compared to Champ Osteen, another player from the mills who made it to the Majors. He moved from mill team to mill team in search of better pay, playing semi-professional baseball by 1905.

Nickname
In an interview published in the October 1949 edition of Sport magazine, Jackson recalled he got his nickname during a mill game played in Greenville, South Carolina. Jackson had blisters on his foot from a new pair of cleats, which hurt so much that he took his shoes off before he was at bat. As play continued, a heckling fan noticed Jackson running to third base in his socks, and shouted "You shoeless son of a gun, you!" and the resulting nickname "Shoeless Joe" stuck with him throughout the remainder of his life.

Professional career

Early professional career
In 1908, Jackson began his professional baseball career with the Greenville Spinners of the Carolina Association, married 15-year-old Katie Wynn, and eventually signed with Connie Mack to play for the Philadelphia Athletics.

Playing for his hometown minor league team for $75 a month, Jackson hit .346 to lead the 1908 Carolina Association, while also leading the league in hits and RBI. In August, 1908, his contract was purchased by Connie Mack of the Philadelphia Athletics for $900. Jackson immediately reported to the Athletics and made his major league debut.

For the first two years of his career Jackson had some trouble adjusting to life with the Athletics; reports conflict as to whether he just did not like the big city or if he was bothered by hazing from teammates. Consequently, he spent a great portion of that time in the minor leagues. Between 1908 and 1909, Jackson appeared in just 10 MLB games. During the 1909 season, Jackson played 118 games for the South Atlantic League's Savannah Indians. He batted .358 for the year.

The Athletics gave up on Jackson in 1910 and traded him to the Cleveland Naps. He spent most of 1910 with the New Orleans Pelicans of the Southern Association, where he won the batting title and led the team to the pennant. Late in the season, he was called up to play on the big league team. He appeared in 20 games and hit .387.

Major League career
In 1911, Jackson's first full MLB season, he set a number of rookie records. His .408 batting average that season is a record that still stands and was good for second overall in the league behind Ty Cobb's .419 - one of the few times in baseball history that a +.400 average did not win a batting title. His .468 on-base percentage led the league. The following season, Jackson batted .395 and led the American League in hits, triples, and total bases. On April 20, 1912, Jackson scored the first run in Tiger Stadium. The next year, he led the league with 197 hits and a .551 slugging percentage.

In August 1915, Jackson was traded to the Chicago White Sox in an extremely lopsided trade favoring the Indians. Two years later, Jackson and the White Sox won the American League pennant and also the World Series. During the series, Jackson hit .307 as the White Sox defeated the New York Giants.

Jackson missed most of the 1918 season while working in a shipyard because of World War I. In 1919, he came back strongly to post a .351 average during the regular season and .375 with perfect fielding in the World Series. However, the heavily favored White Sox lost the series to the Cincinnati Reds. The next season, the 32 year-old Jackson batted .382 and was having one of his best overall seasons, leading the American League in triples and setting by large margins career marks for home runs, RBIs, and fewest strikeouts per plate appearance, when he was suspended, along with seven other members of the White Sox, after allegations surfaced that the team had thrown the previous World Series.

Black Sox Scandal 

After the White Sox lost the 1919 World Series to the Cincinnati Reds, Jackson and seven other White Sox players were accused of accepting $5,000 each to throw the Series. In September 1920, a grand jury was convened to investigate the allegations.

Jackson's 12 base hits set a Series record that was not broken until 1964, and he led both teams with a .375 batting average. He committed no errors, and threw out a runner at the plate. However, the Reds hit an unusually high number of triples to Jackson's position in left field.

During grand jury testimony on September 28, 1920, Jackson admitted to participating in the fix; some news accounts quoted this as:

That precise quote does not appear in a stenographic record of Jackson's grand jury appearance.

In 1921, a Chicago jury acquitted Jackson and his seven teammates of wrongdoing. Nevertheless, Kenesaw Mountain Landis, the newly appointed Commissioner of Baseball, imposed a lifetime ban on all eight players. "Regardless of the verdict of juries," Landis declared, "no player that throws a ballgame; no player that undertakes or promises to throw a ballgame; no player that sits in a conference with a bunch of crooked players and gamblers where the ways and means of throwing games are planned and discussed and does not promptly tell his club about it, will ever play professional baseball."

After the grand jury returned its indictments, Charley Owens of the Chicago Daily News wrote a regretful tribute headlined, "Say it ain't so, Joe." The phrase became legendary when another reporter later erroneously attributed it to a child outside the courthouse: 
When Jackson left the criminal court building in the custody of a sheriff after telling his story to the grand jury, he found several hundred youngsters, aged from 6 to 16, waiting for a glimpse of their idol. One child stepped up to the outfielder, and, grabbing his coat sleeve, said:
"It ain't true, is it, Joe?"
"Yes, kid, I'm afraid it is," Jackson replied. The boys opened a path for the ball player and stood in silence until he passed out of sight.
"Well, I'd never have thought it," sighed the lad.

In an interview in Sport nearly three decades later, Jackson confirmed that the legendary exchange never occurred.

Dispute over Jackson's guilt

Jackson's involvement in the scandal remains controversial to this day. He reportedly refused the $5,000 bribe on two occasions—despite the fact that it would effectively double his salary—only to have teammate Lefty Williams toss the cash on the floor of his hotel room. Jackson then tried to tell White Sox owner Charles Comiskey about the fix, but Comiskey refused to meet with him. Unable to afford legal counsel, Jackson was represented by team attorney Alfred Austrian—a clear conflict of interest. Before Jackson's grand jury testimony, Austrian allegedly elicited Jackson's admission of his supposed role in the fix by plying him with whiskey. Austrian was also able to persuade the nearly illiterate Jackson to sign a waiver of immunity from prosecution.

Years later, the other seven players implicated in the scandal confirmed that Jackson was never at any of the meetings. Williams said that they only mentioned Jackson's name to give their plot more credibility, although he did not say why Jackson would have been paid $5,000 had that been the case. Jackson's performance during the series itself lends further credence to his assertions, although the game records show that he hit far better during the "clean" games than those which were thrown. A 1993 article in The American Statistician reported the results of a statistical analysis of Jackson's contribution during the 1919 World Series, and concluded that there was "substantial support to Jackson's subsequent claims of innocence".

An article in the September 2009 issue of Chicago Lawyer magazine argued that Eliot Asinof's 1963 book Eight Men Out, purporting to confirm Jackson's guilt, was based on inaccurate information; for example, Jackson never confessed to throwing the Series as Asinof claimed. Further, Asinof omitted key facts from publicly available documents such as the 1920 grand jury records and proceedings of Jackson's successful 1924 lawsuit against Comiskey to recover back pay for the 1920 and 1921 seasons. Asinof's use of fictional characters within a supposedly non-fiction account added further questions about the historical accuracy of the book.

Jackson remains on MLB's ineligible list, which automatically precludes his election to the National Baseball Hall of Fame. In 1989, MLB Commissioner A. Bartlett Giamatti declined to reinstate Jackson because the case was "now best given to historical analysis and debate as opposed to a present-day review with an eye to reinstatement."

In November 1999, the U.S. House of Representatives passed a resolution lauding Jackson's sporting achievements and encouraging MLB to rescind his ineligibility. The resolution was symbolic, since the U.S. government has no jurisdiction in the matter. Commissioner Bud Selig stated at the time that Jackson's case was under review, but no decision was issued during Selig's tenure.

In 2015, the Shoeless Joe Jackson Museum formally petitioned Commissioner Rob Manfred for reinstatement, on grounds that Jackson had "more than served his sentence" in the 95 years since his banishment by Landis. Manfred denied the request after an official review, writing: "The results of this work demonstrate to me that it is not possible now, over 95 years since those events took place and were considered by Commissioner Landis, to be certain enough of the truth to overrule Commissioner Landis' determinations".

In 2020, ESPN reported that MLB had shifted its policy, and that the league "has no hold on banned players after they die because the ineligible list bars players from privileges that include a job with a major league club." It is unclear how this will affect Jackson's Hall of Fame prospects.

Career statistics
See baseball statistics for an explanation of these statistics.

Later life

During the remaining 20 years of his baseball career, Jackson played with and managed a number of semi-professional teams, most located in Georgia and South Carolina, under different assumed names. In 1922, Jackson moved to Savannah, Georgia, and opened a dry cleaning business with his wife.

In 1933, the Jacksons moved back to Greenville, South Carolina. After first opening a barbecue restaurant, Jackson and his wife opened "Joe Jackson's Liquor Store", which they operated until his death. One of the better known stories of Jackson's post-major league life took place at his liquor store. Ty Cobb and sportswriter Grantland Rice entered the store, with Jackson showing no sign of recognition of Cobb. After making his purchase, Cobb finally asked Jackson, "Don't you know me, Joe?" Jackson replied, "Sure, I know you, Ty, but I wasn't sure you wanted to know me. A lot of them don't."

As he aged, Jackson began to suffer from heart trouble. In 1951, at the age of 64, he died of a heart attack. Jackson was the first of the eight banned players to die and is buried at Woodlawn Memorial Park in Greenville. He had no children, but he and his wife raised two of his nephews.

Legacy
Though Jackson was banned from Major League Baseball, statues and parks have been constructed in his honor. One of the landmarks built for him was a memorial park in Greenville, Shoeless Joe Jackson Memorial Park. A life-size statue of Jackson, created by South Carolina sculptor Doug Young, also stands in Greenville's West End.

In 2006, Jackson's original home was moved to a location adjacent to Fluor Field in downtown Greenville. The home was restored and opened in 2008 as the Shoeless Joe Jackson Museum. The address is 356 Field Street, in honor of his lifetime batting average. The restoration and move was chronicled on TLC's reality show The Real Deal episode "A Home Run for Trademark" which aired March 31, 2007. Richard C. Davis, the owner of Trademark Properties, hired Josh Hamilton as the construction foreman.

In 1951, Jackson was inducted into the Cleveland Indians Hall of Fame as part of the inaugural class. The selection was controversial at the time because although he was not yet barred from consideration for the National Baseball Hall of Fame, he had also not been enshrined therein. Additionally, his tenure with the Naps/Indians was relatively short. However, an outpouring of support from Indians fans convinced the sports editors voting on the selections to elect him unanimously.

Jackson was inducted into the Baseball Reliquary's Shrine of the Eternals in 2002.

Jackson's first relative to play professional baseball since his banishment was catcher Joseph Ray Jackson. The great-great-grandnephew of Shoeless Joe batted .386 for The Citadel in 2013 and was then drafted by the Texas Rangers. Later that year, he made his professional debut with the Northwest League's Spokane Indians.

In October 2021, a signed photograph of Jackson sold for $1.47 million, making it the most expensive sports photograph.

Films
Shoeless Joe was depicted in several films in the late 20th century. Eight Men Out, a film directed by John Sayles, based on the Eliot Asinof book of the same name, details the Black Sox Scandal in general and has D. B. Sweeney portraying Jackson.

The Phil Alden Robinson film Field of Dreams, based on Shoeless Joe by W. P. Kinsella, stars Ray Liotta as Jackson. Kevin Costner plays an Iowa farmer who hears a mysterious voice instructing him to build a baseball field on his farm so Shoeless Joe—among others—can play baseball again.

See also

 List of Major League Baseball players with a .400 batting average in a season
 List of Major League Baseball annual doubles leaders
 List of Major League Baseball annual triples leaders
 List of Major League Baseball career batting average leaders
 List of Major League Baseball career on-base percentage leaders
 List of Major League Baseball career slugging percentage leaders
 List of Major League Baseball career OPS leaders
 List of Major League Baseball career triples leaders
 List of Major League Baseball triples records
 List of people banned from Major League Baseball
 List of Chicago White Sox team records
 List of Cleveland Indians team records

References

Bibliography
 Eight Men Out by Eliot Asinof
 Say It Ain't So, Joe!: The True Story of Shoeless Joe Jackson by Donald Gropman
 Shoeless: The Life And Times of Joe Jackson by David L. Fleitz
 Shoeless Joe by W. P. Kinsella
 Shoeless Joe & Me by Dan Gutman

External links

ShoelessJoeJackson.com – Jackson's official website
JOE JACKSON BASEBALL Reference Book by Michael L. Miller

1887 births
1951 deaths
Baseball players from South Carolina
Burials in South Carolina
Chicago White Sox players
Cleveland Indians players
Cleveland Naps players
Greenville Spinners players
Major League Baseball controversies
Major League Baseball outfielders
New Orleans Pelicans (baseball) players
People from Pickens County, South Carolina
Philadelphia Athletics players
Savannah Indians players
Semi-professional baseball players
Sportspeople banned for life
Sportspeople from Greenville, South Carolina